Simeon Mechev (Bulgarian: Симеон Мечев; born 16 March 1990) is a Bulgarian professional footballer who plays as a midfielder for Beroe Stara Zagora.

Family
His mother Malina is a Bulgarian pop folk singer and Football agent; his father Krasimir Mechev is a Bulgarian retired footballer.

Career

Youth Clubs
Born in Stara Zagora Mechev played for two youth clubs in your home town, ranging from 1997 to 2007, including Trayana and Beroe. In January 2008 he moved to Slavia Sofia and signed first professional contract.

Mechev spent two seasons at Lokomotiv Gorna Oryahovitsa but was released in September 2017.

References

External links
 

1990 births
Living people
Bulgarian footballers
First Professional Football League (Bulgaria) players
Second Professional Football League (Bulgaria) players
PFC Slavia Sofia players
FC Montana players
PFC Beroe Stara Zagora players
FC Botev Vratsa players
PFC Vidima-Rakovski Sevlievo players
FC Vereya players
Neftochimic Burgas players
FC Lokomotiv Gorna Oryahovitsa players
FC Tsarsko Selo Sofia players
FC Septemvri Sofia players
SFC Etar Veliko Tarnovo players
Association football midfielders
Sportspeople from Stara Zagora